Gen Con is the largest tabletop game convention in North America by both attendance and number of events. It features traditional pen-and-paper, board, and card games, including role-playing games, miniatures wargames, live action role-playing games, collectible card games, and strategy games. Gen Con also features computer games. Attendees engage in a variety of tournament and interactive game sessions. In 2019, Gen Con had nearly 70,000 unique attendees.

Established in 1968 as the Lake Geneva Wargames Convention by Gary Gygax, who later co-created Dungeons & Dragons, Gen Con was first held in Lake Geneva, Wisconsin. The convention was moved to various locations in Wisconsin from 1972 to 1984 before becoming fixed in Milwaukee, Wisconsin, in 1985, where it remained until moving to Indianapolis, Indiana, in 2003. Other Gen Con conventions have been held sporadically in various locations around the United States, as well as internationally.

In 1976, Gen Con became the property of TSR, Inc., the gaming company co-founded by Gary Gygax. TSR (and Gen Con) were then acquired by Wizards of the Coast in 1997, which was subsequently acquired by Hasbro. Hasbro then sold Gen Con to the former CEO of Wizards of the Coast, Peter Adkison, in 2002. Gen Con spent a short time under Chapter 11 bankruptcy protection, due to a lawsuit brought against them by Lucasfilm in 2008. The organization emerged from bankruptcy protection a year later, while still holding its regularly scheduled events and is now larger than ever.

History

Early years 

The International Federation of Wargaming (IFW) hosted a number of small regional conventions in the months following its foundation in 1967, including the first annual club convention in Malvern, Pennsylvania, in August. Some IFW gamers in the Chicago area could not make the journey to Malvern, so they had an informal gathering that same weekend at the Lake Geneva, Wisconsin home of Gary Gygax. Later this gathering would come to be referred to as "Gen Con 0". In 1968, Gygax rented Lake Geneva's Horticultural Hall to hold a follow-up IFW convention, the Lake Geneva Wargames Convention, later known as the Gen Con gaming convention. The IFW, which Gygax co-founded, put up $35 of the $50 Horticultural Hall fee to sponsor this first Gen Con. Almost 100 people attended. At the second Gen Con in August 1969, Gygax met Rob Kuntz and Dave Arneson. During these early conventions, the events centered around board games and miniature wargames.

Gen Con's name is a derivation of "Geneva Convention", due to the convention's origins in Lake Geneva. It is also a play on words, as the "Geneva Conventions" are a set of important international treaties regarding war, the subject of many of the early games. Starting in 1971, Gen Con was cosponsored by the Lake Geneva Tactical Studies Association.

TSR 
Beginning in 1975, Gen Con was managed and hosted by TSR, Inc., original publisher of the Dungeons & Dragons role-playing game. During the following decade the event grew and was hosted at a variety of southern Wisconsin locations, including an American Legion Hall, George Williams College, and the former Lake Geneva Playboy Resort. In 1978 the convention moved to the University of Wisconsin–Parkside campus in Kenosha, where it remained through 1984.

A Gen Con West was held in California for only three years, 1976–1978. From 1978 to 1984, Gen Con South was held in Jacksonville, Florida, and Gen Con East was held in 1981 and 1982, first in Cherry Hill, New Jersey, and then in Chester, Pennsylvania.

MECCA 
In 1985, Gen Con moved to the Milwaukee Exposition & Convention Center & Arena (MECCA) in Milwaukee, due to a need for more space. After the move, attendance steadily rose from 5,000 to a peak of 30,000 in 1995, making Gen Con the premier event in the role-playing game industry. In 1992, Gen Con broke all previous attendance records for any U.S. gaming convention, with more than 18,000 people in attendance.  Gen Con briefly joined forces with its major competitor, the Origins Game Fair, and the two were run as a single convention in 1988. Wizards of the Coast debuted Magic: The Gathering at Gen Con in August 1993; the game proved extremely popular, selling out its supply of 2.5 million cards, which had been scheduled to last until the end of the year. The ensuing collectible card game craze has been credited with generating the extra attendance that produced the 1995 record.

Wizards of the Coast 
Wizards of the Coast purchased TSR in 1997, which was in turn purchased by Hasbro in 1999. Gen Con moved to the Midwest Express Center (now the Wisconsin Center) in 1998. In November 1999 Wizards announced that Gen Con would leave Milwaukee after the 2002 convention. Peter Adkison, founder of Wizards of the Coast, purchased Gen Con from Hasbro in May 2002, forming Gen Con LLC to run the convention.  The first show under Adkison's leadership took place that August in Milwaukee.

Indianapolis 
The convention moved to Indianapolis in 2003. Peter Adkison attributed the move to the lack of hotel space, the convention center layout, and frequently broken escalators in Milwaukee's convention center.

In Indianapolis, the convention, now called Gen Con Indy, continued to draw between 20,000 and 30,000 visitors each year, at the Indiana Convention Center.  Wizards of the Coast helped celebrate the 30th anniversary of the Dungeons & Dragons game at Gen Con Indy 2004. In 2005 Gen Con Indy generated the most direct visitor spending of any annual convention in Indianapolis.

Adkison also restarted the convention in California, this time named Gen Con SoCal.  Smaller than its mid-western counterpart, it drew approximately 6,300 attendees in 2005, making it the third-largest consumer hobby game convention in North America. It was held in the Anaheim Convention Center.

In spite of Adkison saying that he did not want Gen Con to become a "mini-E3" in 2003, when E3 downsized in mid-2006, Gen Con LLC announced it would provide more show space for video game businesses. Gen Con described their intention to "pick up where E3 [left] off".

Also in 2006, Gen Con LLC ran the official Star Wars convention, called Star Wars Celebration, which was held in the banner years of the franchise.

The Indiana Convention Center completed a major expansion in 2011, in large part, to accommodate increased attendance to Gen Con, at a cost of over $275 million.

International 
Gen Con was held in Europe in the 1990s, with the first annual European Gen Con held in Camber Sands, Sussex, England, in 1990, and Gen Con Barcelona in Spain in 1994. The European convention was held in England for 8 years, eventually migrating from Camber Sands in the mid-1990s to Loughborough, where the final UK-based European event was held in 1997; the same weekend on which Princess Diana died.  There was no European Gen Con in 1998, but it reappeared in Belgium in 1999 for a single year, before again reappearing in Paris for three years between 2006 and 2008.  Benelux Gen Con was held in the Netherlands in 1998 and re-occurred there in 2000. Gen Con Barcelona occurred five years, in 1994–1996, 1999, and 2004. Gen Con UK was held between 1998 and 2005. A Gen Con was held in Brisbane, Australia, in July 2008 and again in September 2009. A third Gen Con Australia was scheduled for 2010, but was cancelled.

Events 

The convention features a large exhibit hall filled with game publishers, artists, and related businesses, wherein most attendees spend at least $100. The only game to be on the event schedule every year since the convention's inception is Fight in the Skies, later renamed Dawn Patrol.

The D&D Championship Series (formerly the D&D Open) is a long-running series of Dungeons & Dragons games at Gen Con, beginning in 1977. The RPGA, beginning in 1981, has run large numbers of events at Gen Con, so extensive they have been given their own category. The RPGA events are primarily "Living" games where players create characters who persist between events. The RPGA first ran events in 1981.

In 1987 a games library was added from which attendees could borrow games. Appearing in 1994 was the first Magic: The Gathering World Championship, won by Zak Dolan, who defeated France's Bertrand Lestrée in the finals.

Gen Con has featured a number of events that raise money for a variety of charities. These include Cardhalla, in which donated cards are used to build a large city. Attendees are then invited to throw coins at the city to destroy it. The coins are collected for charity. Cardhalla was first run in 1999.  The gaming group NASCRAG has run Dungeons & Dragons events at Gen Con since 1980. NASCRAG events sometimes donate their ticket fees to charity. The games run tend to be humorous. The Gen Con Live Games Auction is another long-running event, though the majority of the Auction (including the Consignment Store) is not run for charity.

The EN World RPG Awards (the ENnies) are an annual awards ceremony devoted to role-playing games. Established in 2001, the ENnies have been hosted at Gen Con Indy since 2002,  and are organized and owned by EN World, a D&D/d20 System news website.

True Dungeon is an immersive life-sized dungeon crawl live action role-playing game (LARP) run at Gen Con since 2003, featuring a series of puzzles and scenarios designed to recreate a D&D environment.

Issues 
2008 was a tumultuous year, legally, for Gen Con LLC.  On January 10, Lucasfilm filed a lawsuit against them, claiming breach of contract, conversion, and unjust enrichment over Celebration IV, held in 2006. The suit also claims Gen Con failed to give the money raised at a charity auction held at the event to the Make-A-Wish Foundation. Gen Con filed a counter-suit claiming Lucasfilm had no basis for their claims and owed money to Gen Con.

On February 15, 2008, Gen Con LLC announced that it had filed for Chapter 11 bankruptcy protection, citing "significant unforeseen expenses associated with ... externally licensed events". As a result of the bankruptcy filing, the Lucasfilm lawsuit was delayed until November 19, 2008. Gen Con Indy 2008 was held as planned.

On November 20, 2008, a letter of intent to purchase Gen Con LLC's assets was filed with the bankruptcy court. It announced that a to-be-formed company called Gen Con Acquisition Group would purchase Gen Con LLC., for an amount equal to Gen Con LLC's outstanding debt. Gen Con's president, Adrian Swartout, described the letter as "suspiciously cryptic" and concluded that the offer "is not in the best interest of our creditors". Gen Con rejected the hostile takeover bid, and the bankruptcy court allowed Gen Con to emerge from bankruptcy in January 2009, 11 months after it had entered Chapter 11.

In 2008, Christian Children's Fund was reported to have turned down $17,398 from a GenCon Live Game Auction, during that year's Gen Con.  The donation was made in honor of Gary Gygax, who died in 2008, and was a frequent donor to CCF.  Some individuals within the gaming community expressed disappointment about the decision; author and game designer Rich Burlew, for example, called it "insulting," and the response by gamers led both the CCF and Gen Con to issue official statements explaining what had happened. As a result of the misunderstanding, Gen Con chose to support a different charity.

On March 23, 2015, Adrian Swartout sent a letter to Indiana Governor Mike Pence, asking the governor to reconsider his intent to sign SB 101, the so-called "Religious Freedom" bill that already passed both state legislatures. The bill would allow businesses in the state to deny service to anyone on religious grounds, with opponents of the bill stating that it would allow businesses to unfairly single out and discriminate against the LGBT community and other groups. Swartout pointed out in the letter that "Gen Con proudly welcomes a diverse attendee base, made up of different ethnicities, cultures, beliefs, sexual orientations, gender identities, abilities, and socio-economic backgrounds" from over 40 countries and all 50 states, and that welcoming such a "wide-ranging diversity has been a key element to the success and growth of our convention," as well as injecting "over $50 million dollars" annually to the local economy. Swartout stated that signing such a bill "will have a direct negative impact on the state economy and factor into [Gen Con's] decision-making on hosting the convention in the state of Indiana in future years," after the Indiana Convention Center had already completed a major expansion in 2011 to accommodate increased attendance to Gen Con.  Pence signed SB 101 into effect on March 26, 2015.

In August 2022 when Indiana passed a near total ban on abortions, Gen Con tweeted a statement in support of abortion rights, and Gen Con president David Hoppe made the following statement: "Passage of Senate Bill 1 will have an impact on our stakeholders and attendees and will make it more difficult for us to remain committed to Indiana for our long-term home. We are committed here through 2026. We do have to think about what that means beyond that and, of course, we would have to look at what that means for the period up until that time."

Timeline 
Attendance at Gen Con conventions, based on the numbers given below:

1967–2002: Gen Con

2003–present: Gen Con Indy

Auxiliary Gen Cons

1976–1977: Gen Con West

1978–1984: Gen Con South

1981–1982: Gen Con East

1990–2008: European Gen Con

1994–2004: Gen Con Barcelona

1998–2008: Gen Con UK

1998–2000: Gen Con Benelux

2003–2006: Gen Con SoCal

2008–2009: Gen Con Australia

Scheduled future events

Footnotes

Citations

Sources 
  first pages preview

External links 

 

August events
Companies that filed for Chapter 11 bankruptcy in 2008
Esports tournaments
Fan conventions
Festivals in Indianapolis
Gaming conventions
Multigenre conventions
Privately held companies based in Indiana
Recurring events established in 1967
Trade shows in the United States